Gigel Coman (born 4 October 1978) is a Romanian football player and manager. He was raised at Naţional București as a left winger. Currently he is the assistant manager of Liga II club Metaloglobus București.

Club career 

Coman made his professional debut at FC Naţional București in 1996, before moving to FCU Politehnica Timişoara in the winter break of the 2004–05 season.

In the summer of 2006, at the request of Cosmin Olăroiu – Steaua București's head coach – Coman is signed by Steaua București.

International career 

As of 30 June 2006, Coman won three caps for Romania.

International stats

Honours

Metaloglobus București
Liga III: 2016–17

External links
 
 

1978 births
Association football wingers
Living people
Footballers from Bucharest
Romania international footballers
Romanian footballers
Liga I players
Liga II players
FC Progresul București players
FC Politehnica Timișoara players
FC Steaua București players
FC Universitatea Cluj players
CS Otopeni players
FC Metaloglobus București players
Romanian football managers
FC Metaloglobus București managers